Murodov (masculine) or Murodova (feminine) is a patronymic surname derived from the given name Murod. Notable people with the surname include:

Jurabek Murodov, Tajik singer and songwriter
Botir Murodov, Olympic rower
Azizbek Murodov, Uzbek wrestler
Otabek Murodov

See also
Muradov (surname)

Patronymic surnames